Leah Baird (born Ada Frankenstein; June 20, 1883 – October 3, 1971) was an American actress and screenwriter.

Life
Baird was born in Champaign County, Illinois.  on June 20, 1883, the daughter of William Frankenstein and Bertha Schreiver Frankenstein Rathjen. She had two older sisters, Augusta and Mathilda. Both her parents were alcoholics and her mother was one of the richest madams in Central Illinois.

An early star for Vitagraph Studios, Baird began her film career in 1910 in Jean and the Waif opposite Jean, the Vitagraph Dog. She played several leads in William F. Brady's troupe, opposite Douglas Fairbanks. In the late 1910s she played in 15 episodes of the serial Wolves of Kultur. Baird wrote and produced film during the 1920s.

Baird later became a screenwriter and contributed to a number of Clara Bow features. She was married to producer Arthur F. Beck.

Baird was under contract to Warner Bros. for seventeen years, where she appeared in character roles and as an extra.

Partial filmography

Actress

 Jean and the Waif (1910, Short)
 Chumps (1912, Short) - Terpsine - the Cause
 A Cure for Pokeritis (1912, Short)
 All for a Girl (1912, Short) - Mrs. Gardner
 Red and White Roses (1913, Short) - Beth Whitney
 Hearts of the First Empire (1913, Short) - Beatrice
 Ivanhoe (1913) - Rebecca of York
 Absinthe (1914) - Madame Dumas
 Neptune's Daughter (1914) - Princess Olga
 The Man That Might Have Been (1914, Short) - Mrs. William Rudd
 Lights of New York (1916) - Yolande Cowles
 The People vs. John Doe (1916) - Woman Lawyer
 The Devil's Pay Day (1917) - Jean Haskins
 One Law for Both (1917) - Helen
 Sins of Ambition (1917) - Laurette Maxwell
 The Fringe of Society (1917) - Myra Strang
 A Sunset (1917)
 Moral Suicide (1918) - Fay Hope
 Life or Honor? (1918) - Helen West
 Wolves of Kultur (1918) - Alice Grayson
 The Echo of Youth (1919) - Olive Martin
 As a Man Thinks (1919) - Elinor Clayton
 The Volcano (1919) - Ruth Carroll
 The Capitol (1919)  - Margaret Kennard / Agnes Blake
 Cynthia of the Minute (1920) - Cynthia
 The Heart Line (1921) - Fancy Gray
 The Bride's Confession (1921)
 Don't Doubt Your Wife (1922) - Rose Manning
 When the Devil Drives (1922) - Blanche Mansfield
 When Husbands Deceive (1922) - Viola Baxter
 Is Divorce A Failure? (1923) - Carol Lockwood
 The Destroying Angel (1923) - Mary Miller / Saraa Law
 The Miracle Makers (1923) - Doris Mansfield
 Fangs of the Wolf (1924)
 The Unnamed Woman (1925) - Billie Norton
 Bullets for O'Hara (1941) - Police Matron
 Bad Men of Missouri (1941) - Ms. Brooks (uncredited)
 Manpower (1941) - Mrs. Taylor - Prison Matron (uncredited)
 One Foot in Heaven (1941) - Minor Role (uncredited)
 Blues in the Night (1941) - Nurse (uncredited)
 The Body Disappears (1941) - Rest Home Nurse (uncredited)
 Dangerously They Live (1941) - Fake Telephone Operator (uncredited)
 The Man Who Came to Dinner (1942) - Fan at Train Station (uncredited)
 All Through the Night (1942) - Woman (uncredited)
 Kings Row (1942) - Aunt Mamie (uncredited)
 The Male Animal (1942) - Trustee's Wife (uncredited)
 Lady Gangster (1942) - Prison Matron
 Yankee Doodle Dandy (1942) - Housekeeper (uncredited)
 The Big Shot (1942) - Mrs. Carter (uncredited)
 Secret Enemies (1942) - Hotel Maid (uncredited)
 Busses Roar (1942) - Second Old Maid
 Truck Busters (1943) - Floor Nurse (uncredited)
 Air Force (1943) - Nurse #2 (uncredited)
 Action in the North Atlantic (1943) - Mother (uncredited)
 This Is the Army (1943) - Old-Timer's Wife (uncredited)
 Watch on the Rhine (1943) - Miss Drake (uncredited)
 Thank Your Lucky Stars (1943) - Bus Passenger (uncredited)
 The Desert Song (1943) - Arab Woman (uncredited)
 The Adventures of Mark Twain (1944) - Elderly Woman (uncredited)
 Make Your Own Bed (1944) - John's Wife (uncredited)
 The Last Ride (1944) - Mrs. Bronson (uncredited)
 Pillow to Post (1945) - Sailor's Mother (uncredited)
 Mildred Pierce (1945) - Police Matron (uncredited)
 My Reputation (1946) - Minor Role (uncredited)
 Shadow of a Woman (1946) - Mrs. Calvin
 The Verdict (1946) - French Charwoman (uncredited)
 Humoresque (1946) - Professor (uncredited)
 Flaxy Martin (1949) - Tenement Resident (uncredited)
 The Girl from Jones Beach (1949) - Board Member (uncredited)
 The Man Who Cheated Himself (1950) - Police Matron (uncredited)
 How to Be Very, Very Popular (1955) - (uncredited)
 Around the World in Eighty Days (1956) - Minor Role (uncredited)
 The Phantom Stagecoach (1957) - Mrs. Simms (uncredited)
 The Hard Man (1957) - Townswoman (uncredited) (final film role)

Writer
 The Dawning (1912)
 Barriers Burned Away (1925)
 The Primrose Path (1925)
 Devil's Island (1926)
 Spangles (1926)
 The False Alarm (1926)
 The Return of Boston Blackie (1927)
 Stolen Pleasures (1927)
 Jungle Bride (1933)

Producer
 Cynthia of the Minute (1920)
 Shadow of the Law (1926)

References

External links

 Leah Baird on Women Film Pioneers Project

Leah Baird at Turner Classic Movies

Leah Baird gallery at NY Public Library
Leah Baird early studio portrait

American silent film actresses
American women screenwriters
Screenwriters from Illinois
Film producers from Illinois
Actresses from Chicago
Burials at Hollywood Forever Cemetery
Warner Bros. contract players
1883 births
1971 deaths
20th-century American actresses
Women film pioneers
American women film producers
20th-century American women writers
20th-century American screenwriters